Arne Holm (born 22 December 1961) is a retired Swedish athlete who specialised in the triple jump. He represented his country at two outdoor and two indoor World Championships.

His personal bests in the event are 17.05 metres outdoors (Gothenburg 1987) and 16.97 metres indoors (Borlänge 1996).

International competitions

References

1961 births
Living people
Swedish male triple jumpers